This is a list of notable residents of Marylebone.
Sherlock Holmes of 221B Baker Street is perhaps the best-known fictional resident. Actual residents, past and present, include:

See also
List of people from London

References